Isomäki Areena (also known as West Areena for sponsorship reasons) is an ice hockey arena located in Pori, Finland. The arena is used by Porin Ässät and Karhu HT. The arena was opened in 1971 and the capacity for hockey games is 6 350.

History

Artificial ice rink 

The Isomäen tekojäärata (Isomäki artificial ice rink) was originally built as an artificial ice rink in 1964 and replaced the natural ice of Juhannuslehto in the Herralahti district. The following year, the B-series matches of the World Hockey Championships in Finland were played on this rink.

New arena 

The artificial ice was transformed into an arena in 1971 after the first Ässät won the championship for the first time. The arena had a capacity of about 8,000 spectators. There were no seats at all in the arena, and the ice was surrounded on three sides by a partly wooden standing auditorium. The arena was improved during the 1970s and, for example, the first seats were built for about 500 people at the end of the decade. At the same time, the arena got its first decent changing rooms. In the past, the teams had had to change their equipment in the Pori Stadium a couple of hundred meters away, and walk from there to the arena. The standing auditorium was also expanded on top of the changing rooms. In the spring of 1978, an all-time record was seen in Isomäki, when the decisive final match of the Finnish Championship League between Ässät and Tappara was crowded to be watched by an estimated 13,000 people. The official audience for the match was reported to be 9,364.

Renovations 
The arena underwent its first major renovation in 1986–1987. thermal insulation and heating were installed into the arena, and the seating area was expanded. With the new east-facing seating area, the audience capacity of the Porin jäähalli was reduced to 7,500 spectators. A second renovation was made in 1993 when the seating area was expanded. The standing auditorium at the west end was replaced with seats in 1996. The arena underwent a third major renovation in 1998. Additional seats were built and the wooden standing auditorium was replaced with a new concrete structure. At the same time, a second floor was built in the arena, which included new restaurant, sales and sanitary facilities, as well as modern benches. Ticket sales were also transferred from the ticket offices outside to the interior. Capacity decreased in the 1990s by about a thousand spectators when standing auditoriums were replaced by seats, and for the first time in 1998-1999 there were more seats than standing auditoriums. The renovated hall had only 2,500 standing auditoriums. There were seats for 4,400 people. In 2010, a modern scoreboard showing a video was installed in the arena.

After the 2014-16 renovations 

The most recent major renovation took place in 2014–2016, when the locker room facilities in the arena were upgraded and a new three-storey extension was built at the end of the arena. Restaurant facilities were also improved and expanded. In connection with the renovation, the technologies of the entire arena were also renewed. At the same time, the capacity of the standing auditorium was reduced to about 2,200 spectators. In connection with the reform, Länsi-Suomen Osuuspankki became the main partner of Ässät. It renamed the Porin jäähalli "Isomäki Areena". The arena can accommodate 6,350 people after the latest renovation.

Renaming of the arena (2022) 

In 2022, when the club ran into financial difficulties, the City of Pori bought the shares of Kiinteistö Oy Porin Jäähalli owned by HC Ässät Pori Oy, after which the city owns the arena alone. The name sponsor of the arena expired in 2022 and the naming rights were given to the advertising agency West Creative Oy. The arena will be known as "West Areena" during the 2022-23 season.

Finland vs Denmark is scheduled to be played in the Isomäki Areena on April 21 2023

Notable events

International 
 1976 World Junior Ice Hockey Championships
 1965 Ice Hockey World Championships (Group B)
 Finland vs Denmark is scheduled to be played in the Isomäki Areena on April 21 2023

National 
The 1978 SM-liiga finals were played in the Isomäki Areena and the Hakametsän jäähalli in Tampere.

The 1979 SM-liiga finals were played in the Isomäki Areena and the Hakametsän jäähalli in Tampere.

The 1980 SM-liiga finals were played in the Isomäki Areena and the Helsinki Ice Hall in Helsinki.

The 1984 SM-liiga finals were played in the Isomäki Areena and the Hakametsän jäähalli in Tampere.

The 2006 SM-liiga finals were played in the Isomäki Areena and the Ritari-areena in Hämeenlinna.

The 2009 SM-liiga relegation series was played in the Isomäki Areena and the Vaasa Arena in Vaasa.

The 2013 SM-liiga finals were played in the Isomäki Areena and the Hakametsän jäähalli in Tampere.

Retired jerseys

Ässät 
2: Antti Heikkilä

4: Arto Javanainen

11: Raimo Kilpiö

12: Tapio Levo

13: Veli-Pekka ketola

89: Jaroslav Otevrel

Karhut 
13: Lasse Heikkilä

RU-38 
11: Raimo Kilpiö

See also
List of indoor arenas in Finland
List of indoor arenas in Nordic countries

References

Sources

Notes 

Ässät
Buildings and structures in Pori
Ice hockey venues in Finland
Indoor ice hockey venues in Finland